is a Japanese seinen manga magazine published by Media Factory. The first issue was released on June 27, 2006.

Serialized titles
Absolute Duo
Alice or Alice (until 2015, part of the supplement magazine Comic Cune)
Ano Ko ni Kiss to Shirayuri wo
Asobi ni Ikuyo!
Boku wa Tomodachi ga Sukunai
Bone Crusher
Chaos;Head -Blue Complex-
Classroom Crisis
Combatants Will Be Dispatched! (ongoing)
D-Frag! (ongoing)
Gakuen 86
Hai-Furi
Hanna of the Z
Happiness!
Happy Days Academy
Hentai Ouji to Warawanai Neko.
Hinako Note (until 2015, part of the supplement magazine Comic Cune)
Honey Cosmos
Hortensia Saga (ongoing)
Iris Zero (ongoing)
Infinite Stratos
Jishou F-Rank no Oniisama ga Game de Hyouka sareru Gakuen no Chouten ni Kunrin suru Sou desu yo? (ongoing)
Kage Kara Mamoru!
Kaiju Girl Caramelise
Kami wa Game ni Ueiteru
Kamiburo
Kandachime
Kanokon
Kantai Collection
Kämpfer
Kono Naka ni Hitori, Imōto ga Iru!
Kono Subarashii Sekai ni Bakuen wo!
Kūsen Madōshi Kōhosei no Kyōkan
Liar Liar (ongoing)
Magician's Academy
Maria Holic
Magika no Kenshi to Shoukan Maou
Mayo Chiki
MM!
Ms. Vampire Who Lives in My Neighborhood (until 2015, part of the supplement magazine Comic Cune)
No Game No Life
Non Non Biyori
Oniichan dakedo Ai sae Areba Kankeinai yo ne!
Osamake (ongoing)
The Other Side of Secret
-OZ-
Ramen Tenshi Pretty Menma
Re:BIRTH -The Lunatic Taker-
Re:Zero kara Hajimeru Isekai Seikatsu: Daiisshō - Ōto no Ichinichi-hen
Re:Zero kara Hajimeru Isekai Seikatsu: Daisanshō - Truth of Zero
Re:Zero kara Hajimeru Isekai Seikatsu: Daiyonshō - The Sanctuary and the Witch of Greed
Seiken no Blacksmith
Senran Kagura (ongoing)
Spirits & Cat Ears (until 2017, moved to Comic Cune)
Steins;Gate
Taboo Tattoo 
Tantei wa Mō, Shindeiru
Tai-Madō Gakuen 35 Shiken Shōtai (ongoing)
Tears to Tiara: Kakan no Daichi
The Severing Crime Edge
There's a Demon Lord on the Floor
Tsuki Tsuki!
Unbreakable Machine Doll
Union!
Whispered Words
Yururizumi
Zero no Tsukaima

See also
List of manga magazines

External links
Official website  

Monthly manga magazines published in Japan
Magazines established in 2006
2006 establishments in Japan
Seinen manga magazines
Media Factory magazines